Mantri Square is a shopping mall situated in the Malleswaram locality in Bangalore, Karnataka, India. Mantri Square is one of the biggest malls in the country. It also has metro rail-connectivity with Sampige Road metro station.

Mall Facilities
Facilities at the Mantri Square mall are:

 Department stores 
 An expansive hypermarket spread over 9,000 square feet
 Six-screen INOX multiplex
 Amoeba bowling alley and gaming centre
 Food court and dining area spread over 100,000 square feet with 39 food and beverage outlets
 Scary house and Demon Jungle is located at mantri square

It was announced in 2010 that Mantri Square would be connected by the Bangalore Metro with the rest of the city.

Controversies
On 2 June 2011, Bruhat Bangalore Mahanagara Palike (BBMP), the civic authority managing the mall, demolished the compound wall and the ramp of Mantri Square on Sampige Road citing traffic congestion and widening of Sampige Road.

On 16 Jan 2017, the mall was temporarily closed. Concurrently BBMP withdrew the mall's occupancy certificate following a scaffolding collapse which had injured 2 housekeeping staff.

Regional Commissioner has ruled that the land belongs to the BBMP and directed the civic body to take possession of the land.

Gallery

See also
Sampige Road metro station
List of shopping malls in India

References

External links

 

Shopping malls established in 2010
Shopping malls in Bangalore
2010 establishments in Karnataka